Kocatepe is a Turkish word and may refer to:

People
 Yasin Kocatepe (born 1991), Turkish professional footballer

Places
Kocatepe (Istanbul Metro), a rapid transit station on the M1 line of the Istanbul Metro, Turkey
 Kocatepe Mosque, the largest mosque in Ankara, Turkey
 Afyon Kocatepe University, a state university in Afyonkarahisar, Turkey
 Kocatepe, Afyonkarahisar, a town in Afyonkarahisar Province, Turkey

Other uses
 TCG Kocatepe, three warships operated by the Turkish Navy